The 2003 Firestone Indy 400 was the tenth round of the 2003 IndyCar Series season. The race was held on July 27, 2003 at the 2.00 mi Michigan International Speedway in Brooklyn, Michigan. In one of the closest finishes in series history, Mo Nunn Racing driver Alex Barron beat Sam Hornish Jr. by about one hundredth of a second, with polesitter Tomas Scheckter finishing 3rd. Reminiscent of Danny Sullivan's "spin and win" at the 1985 Indianapolis 500, Barron spun while in the lead with thirty seven laps to go but he avoided contact with the wall or other cars and was able to use the draft to work his way back to the front and remain side-by-side with Hornish for the lead during the final twenty laps.

Barron was in his second race for Mo Nunn Racing as a replacement for an injured Felipe Giaffone and was looking for a good result after a solid qualifying. Chip Ganassi Racing locked out the front row, but it was Hornish and his exclusive next-generation Chevrolet Indy V8 engine that dominated the race. Barron's spin on Lap 163 brought out a caution that bunched up the field and allowed the drivers to make a pit stop, setting up a thirty five-lap sprint to the finish. Multiple cars raced side-by-side and even three-wide as the laps ran down, but by Lap 180 it was a two-car race between Barron and Hornish for the win. Hornish stuck to the inside of the track and forced Barron to pass on the outside, but the air resistance generated by the 220 mph speeds meant that Barron physically could not complete the pass and move down to the inside line that Hornish was running. On the final lap of the race, Barron moved his car directly behind Hornish on the back-straight to take advantage of the draft; from there he used the extra momentum to dart back to the outside in Turns 3 and 4, get alongside Hornish, and cross the finish line first by just 0.0121 seconds, at the time the fourth closest finish in IndyCar history.

The win was both Barron's and Mo Nunn Racing's second win in IndyCar competition; it would also be the last win for both driver and team. It was also the race with the fastest average speed in IndyCar history at 180.917 mph until next year's race in 2004.

Qualifying

Race 

 Includes 1 bonus point for leading the most laps.
 Includes 2 bonus points for pole position.

Race Statistics 
 Lead changes: 30 among 6 drivers

Standings after the race 
 Drivers' Championship standings

 Note: Only the top five positions are included for the standings.

References 

2003 in IndyCar
Michigan Indy 400
2003 in sports in Michigan